Leonard M. Elstad (February 8, 1899 – June 27, 1990) was the third President of Gallaudet University (then Gallaudet College) in Washington, D.C. Elstad, who obtained a Master's degree from Gallaudet in 1923 and two honorary degrees later in his life, presided over an important period of Gallaudet's history, which came to be called the "Elstad Expansion Era," when Gallaudet achieved accreditation (1957) and was significantly expanded, both in terms of enrollment and the number and capacity of the buildings on campus.

External links
 http://saveourdeafschools.org/expansion_era.pdf
 A Historical Timeline
 https://www.gallaudet.edu/archives-and-deaf-collections/collections/manuscripts/mss-183
 My Yesterday's: In a Changing World of the Deaf by Mervin D. Garretson, pp. 188–120.
 Oral History Project: Dr. Leonard Elstad, filmed in 1977.
 Deaf Mosaic, episode 605 (21:14-24:01).
 New York Times obituary, June 29, 1990.
 Buff and Blue article, October 23, 1945, p. 1.

References

Presidents of Gallaudet University
1899 births
1990 deaths
Gallaudet University alumni
20th-century American academics